Events from the year 1833 in Germany

Incumbents
 Kingdom of Prussia
 Monarch – Frederick William III of Prussia (16 November 1797 – 7 June 1840)
 Kingdom of Bavaria
 Monarch - Ludwig I (1825–1848)
 Kingdom of Saxony
 Anthony (5 May 1827 – 6 June 1836)
 Kingdom of Hanover
 William IV (26 June 1830 to 1837)
 Kingdom of Württemberg
 William (1816–1864)

Events 
 6 February – His Royal Highness Prince Otto Friedrich Ludwig of Bavaria assumes the title His Majesty Othon the First, by the Grace of God, King of Greece, Prince of Bavaria.
 6 May – Carl Friedrich Gauss and Wilhelm Weber obtain permission to build an electromagnetic telegraph in Göttingen.
 14 December – Kaspar Hauser, a mysterious German youth, is stabbed, dying three days later on 17 December.

Date unknown
 The dawn of biochemistry: The first enzyme, diastase, is discovered by Anselme Payen.

Births 

 5 January – Eugene W. Hilgard, German-American "Father of soil science" (d. 1916)
 28 February – Alfred von Schlieffen, German field marshal (d. 1913)
 5 May – Lazarus Fuchs, German mathematician (d. 1902)
 7 May – Johannes Brahms, German composer (d. 1897)

 3 August – Auguste Schmidt, German educator, women's rights activist (d. 1902)
 25 December – Princess Adelheid-Marie of Anhalt-Dessau (d. 1916)

Deaths 
 16 January – Nannette Streicher, German piano maker, composer, music educator, and writer (b. 1769)
 16 October – Meno Haas, German-born copperplate engraver (b. 1752)
 17 December – Kaspar Hauser, German youth of uncertain origin (stabbed) (b. 1812?)

References 

Years of the 19th century in Germany
Germany
Germany